This is a list of notable people associated with the University of Minnesota.

Alumni

Nobel laureates

Pulitzer Prize winners

Carl Dennis, Pulitzer Prize winner in 2002 for Poetry
Thomas Friedman, Pulitzer Prize winner in 1983 and 1988 for International Reporting and 2002 for Commentary; studied at the University of Minnesota from 1971 to 1973 before transferring to Brandeis University

Law and politics

Vice presidents

Hubert H. Humphrey, former U.S. vice president and 1968 Democratic nominee for president
Walter Mondale, former U.S. vice president and 1984 Democratic nominee for president

Cabinet members and diplomats

Members of Congress

Governors

Article III judges

State judges

Attorneys general

Keith Ellison, current Minnesota Attorney General
William S. Ervin, former Minnesota Attorney General
Mike Hatch, former Minnesota Attorney General
 Douglas M. Head, former Minnesota Attorney General
 Hubert H. Humphrey III, former Minnesota Attorney General
 Henry Linde, former North Dakota Attorney General
 Robert W. Mattson, Sr., former Minnesota Attorney General
 William D. Mitchell, former U.S. Attorney General
 Byron S. Payne, former South Dakota Attorney General
 Harry H. Peterson, former Minnesota Attorney General
 Albert F. Pratt, former Minnesota Attorney General
 Warren Spannaus, former Minnesota Attorney General
Leo A. Temmey, former Attorney General of South Dakota

Foreign

Others in law and politics

Leadership and business

Science and medicine

Academics and education

Arts and entertainment

Athletics

Others
 Sarah Hart (née Gengler) - Perpetrator of the Hart family murders - Attended the university for one semester and transferred to Northern State University in South Dakota.
 Dale Snodgrass - United States Navy avaiator and air show performer who was considered one of the greatest fighter pilots of all time.

Faculty

Nobel laureates

Pulitzer Prize winners
 Robert Penn Warren, Pulitzer Prize winner in 1947 for the novel All the King's Men; won Pulitzers in poetry in 1958 for Promises: Poems 1954–1956, and in 1979 for Now and Then
 John Berryman, Pulitzer Prize winner in 1965 for Poetry
 Dominick Argento, Pulitzer Prize winner in 1975 for Music

University of Minnesota presidents

Chancellors
 Edward Duffield Neill, 1858–1861

Professors

Present Regents Professors

References

List

University of Minnesota people